PGC or LEDA 2933 is a faint dwarf irregular galaxy in the Sculptor Group. It can be seen in the southern constellation Phoenix. According to measurements, the galaxy is located 11.15 million light-years away.

Because it is situated in the Sculptor Group, it is one of the closest galaxies to the Milky Way. It is obscured by a few brighter stars and galaxies (the brightest of them on the right side of the photo is 1425 light-years away from the Solar System).

The galaxy has a diameter of 2,000 light years.

References

Dwarf irregular galaxies
Sculptor Group
Phoenix (constellation)
Principal Galaxies Catalogue objects